Angel [] is a river of North Rhine-Westphalia, Germany, a  tributary of the Werse.

See also
List of rivers of North Rhine-Westphalia

References

External links

Rivers of Germany
Rivers of North Rhine-Westphalia